Alexander Dmitrievich Zinoviev, in , born in Koporye on 16 May 1854 and died in Rome on 7 February 1931, was a Russian politician, privy counsellor (1906), Civil Governor of Saint Petersburg from 6 March 1903 to January 1911, member of the State Council of the Russian Empire (1911), Marshal of the Nobility from 8 August 1897 to February 1904.

Biography 
Born into a family of the Russian nobility, Alexander Dmitrievich Zinoviev studied law at the University of Saint Petersburg and graduated in 1877.

From 1884 to 1897, Zinoviev was a member of the nobility for the region of Saint Petersburg. Between 1897 and 1902 he served as head of the nobility of the same region. On 6 March 1903, Nicholas II of Russia appointed him Civil Governor of Saint Petersburg, a position in which he remained until January 1911. During the same period he was Senior Director of Saint Petersburg and Malo-Krestovsky. In 1911, Zinoviev was admitted to the Council of State.

During his tenure as Civil Governor of Saint Petersburg, the Church of the Savior on Spilled Blood, whose work began in 1883, was completed in 1907.

After the October Revolution, Zinoviev fled Russia. He died in Rome in 1931.

He was the brother of Lydia Zinovieva-Annibal (1866–1907), poet and writer, second wife of Vyacheslav Ivanov, with whom she hosted in Saint Petersburg "The Tower", the most important literary and artistic salon of the Silver Age.

Bibliography 
J. N. Dlugolensky Civil-military and police authorities in St. Petersburg, 1703-1917. St. Petersburg, 2001. pp. 237–239.

See also

Connected articles 
 Saint Petersburg Governorate

External links 
 Saint Petersburg Encyclopaedia

1854 births
1931 deaths
People from Lomonosovsky District, Leningrad Oblast
People from Petergofsky Uyezd
Russian nobility
Members of the State Council (Russian Empire)
Saint Petersburg State University alumni
Recipients of the Order of the White Eagle (Russia)
Recipients of the Order of St. Vladimir, 2nd class
Recipients of the Order of St. Vladimir, 3rd class
Recipients of the Order of St. Vladimir, 4th class
Commandeurs of the Légion d'honneur
Commanders Grand Cross of the Order of the Polar Star
Recipients of the Order of St. Anna, 1st class
Recipients of the Order of Saint Stanislaus (Russian), 1st class